Yusuf Demir (born 2 June 2003) is an Austrian professional footballer who plays as a winger for Turkish Süper Lig club Galatasaray and the Austria national team.

Club career

Early life 
Yusuf Demir was born on 2 June 2003, in Vienna, Austria, to Turkish parents, with his family roots in Trabzon, Turkey.

Rapid Wien
On 26 May 2019, Demir signed a professional contract with Rapid Wien. Demir made his professional debut with Rapid Wien in a 3–0 league win over Admira on 14 December 2019. On 15 September 2020, Demir scored a goal for Rapid Wien in 2–1 defeat against Gent in the UEFA Champions League third qualifying round, at 17 years, three months and 13 days old, to become the youngest Austrian scorer since Gerd Wimmer in 1994, aged 17 years, ten months and 27 days.

Barcelona
In July 2021, Barcelona announced the signing of Demir on a season-long loan from Rapid Wien for €500,000, with an option to make the move permanent in the future for a further €10 million, but if the player reached ten appearances the club would be obligated to activate it.

On 23 August, 2021, Demir made his competitive debut against Athletic Bilbao. He came on as a replacement for Martin Braithwaite after 61 minutes, becoming Barça's youngest foreign debutant since Lionel Messi (aged 17 years and 114 days) did so in 2004.

On 31 August 2021, Demir was registered by Barcelona to play in La Liga as a first-team player after he was previously set to be registered in the reserves. He was handed the number 11 jersey that was previously held by Ousmane Dembélé.

On 13 January 2022, the loan was terminated, and Demir returned to Austria.

Galatasaray
On 8 September 2022, he signed a 4-year contract with Galatasaray. It has been announced that a transfer fee of €6,000,000 will be paid to the player's former team, Rapid Wien.

International career
Demir is a youth international for Austria. He debuted for the senior Austria national team in a 3–1 2022 FIFA World Cup qualification win over the Faroe Islands on 28 March 2021.

Career statistics

Club

International

References

External links
 
 
 Yusuf Demir at OEFB 

2003 births
Living people
Footballers from Vienna
Austrian footballers
Austria youth international footballers
Austria under-21 international footballers
Austria international footballers
Association football forwards
SK Rapid Wien players
FC Barcelona players
Austrian Football Bundesliga players
La Liga players
Austrian expatriate footballers
Expatriate footballers in Spain
Austrian expatriate sportspeople in Spain
Austrian people of Turkish descent
Galatasaray S.K. footballers
Süper Lig players